Pultenaea pycnocephala, commonly known as dense-head bush-pea, is a species of flowering plant in the family Fabaceae and is endemic to eastern Australia. It is an erect shrub with hairy branches, egg-shaped leaves with the narrower end towards the base and yellow to red and purple, pea-like flowers.

Description

Taxonomy
Pultenaea pycnocephala was first formally described in 1864 by George Bentham in Flora Australiensis from an unpublished description by Ferdinand von Mueller. The specific epithet (pycnocephala) means "dense-headed".

Distribution and habitat
Dense-headed bush-pea grows in forest, woodland and swampy places and is found south from Moreton Bay in south-east Queensland to the Gibraltar Range and Werrikimbe National Parks in northern New South Wales.

References

Fabales of Australia
Flora of New South Wales
Flora of Queensland
pycnocephala
Plants described in 1864
Taxa named by George Bentham